Mali competed at the 2016 Summer Paralympics in Rio de Janeiro, Brazil, from 7 September to 18 September 2016.

Athletics

Men's Track

Women's Field

See also 
Mali at the 2016 Summer Olympics

References 

Nations at the 2016 Summer Paralympics
2016
Para